The Guangzhou–Macau Expressway, designated as G0425 and  commonly referred to as the Guang'ao Expressway is an expressway that connects the cities of Guangzhou, Guangdong, and Macau, a Special Administrative Region of the People's Republic of China. It is a spur line of the G4 Beijing–Hong Kong and Macau Expressway.

The extension to Macau at the Lotus Bridge is planned, so the current southern terminus is in Zhuhai at Zhuhai Avenue.

The major cities connected by this expressway are:
 Guangzhou, Guangdong
 Zhongshan, Guangdong
 Zhuhai, Guangdong
 Macau

Exit list

References

Expressways in Guangdong
Expressways in Macau
0425